Ezequiel Palomeque Mena (born 7 October 1992) is a Colombian footballer (defender) who is currently playing for Alianza Petrolera.

External links
 
 Profile at FC Gomel website

1992 births
Living people
Colombian footballers
Association football defenders
Colombian expatriate footballers
FK Spartaks Jūrmala players
SK Sigma Olomouc players
FC Gomel players
C.D. Plaza Amador players
Cortuluá footballers
Atlético Nacional footballers
Deportivo Cali footballers
Unión Española footballers
Al-Raed FC players
Alianza Petrolera F.C. players
Chilean Primera División players
Categoría Primera A players
Saudi Professional League players
Expatriate footballers in Chile
Expatriate footballers in Latvia
Expatriate footballers in Belarus
Expatriate footballers in the Czech Republic
Expatriate footballers in Panama
Expatriate footballers in Saudi Arabia
Colombian expatriate sportspeople in Chile
Colombian expatriate sportspeople in Latvia
Colombian expatriate sportspeople in Belarus
Colombian expatriate sportspeople in the Czech Republic
Colombian expatriate sportspeople in Panama
Colombian expatriate sportspeople in Saudi Arabia
People from Quibdó
Sportspeople from Chocó Department